Kongar-ool Borisovich Ondar (Ondar Konggar-ool Boris oglu, ; 29 March 1962 – 25 July 2013) was a master Soviet and Russian Tuvan throat singer and a member of the Great Khural of Tuva. Ondar was born near the Khemchik River in western Tuva, in the village of Iyme. In the Central Asian tradition of self-fulfilling child naming, Kongar-ool literally translates to "loud boy." In 1983 Ondar was drafted into the army, but was discharged due to a neck injury. After, he served several years in prison in Siberia. In 1992, after his release, Ondar won an international throat-singing contest, which brought invitations to perform in Europe and the United States and began his singing career.

Considered a living treasure by the Republic of Tuva, Ondar was granted a stipend and an apartment for the musical skills he possessed. Jovial and personable, Ondar is probably the best-known face of khöömei throat singing to Westerners, appearing on the Late Show with David Letterman, the Oscar-nominated documentary Genghis Blues, and in interviews for CNN and other networks. Ondar was also a teacher and opened a Center for the Development of Tuvan Traditional Arts in Kyzyl.

Ondar is also known outside Tuva for inviting American blues musician Paul Pena to Tuva. Pena, who had learned throat singing before coming to Tuva, was the subject of the documentary Genghis Blues in which Ondar was also featured. In 1993, he performed at Frank Zappa's eclectic "garden party/soiree" gathering in his last days.

He also appears on the Béla Fleck and the Flecktones albums Outbound, album/DVD Live at the Quick, and Jingle All the Way. He released one album on Warner Bros. Records, Back Tuva Future.

His first studio album, 1996's Echoes of Tuva, was released by the TuvaMuch Music label. He released another album sampling physicist Richard Feynman titled Tuva Talk.

He died after emergency surgery for a brain hemorrhage in Kyzyl on July 25, 2013. He was 51 years old.

References

External links
Kongar-ol Ondar's homepage

 Tyvam (My Tuva) by Kongar-ol Ondar, Evgeny Saryglar and Alash Ensemble with subtitles
 Live performance on The Chevy Chase Show in 1993 with Bady-Dorzhu Ondar
 Live performance on Late Show with David Letterman in 1999
 Live performance at Kraft House

1962 births
2013 deaths
People from Dzun-Khemchiksky District
21st-century Russian male singers
21st-century Russian singers
Tuvan musicians
Russian folk singers
Russian politicians
Throat singing
Warner Records artists
Tuvan throat singing
People from Kyzyl
20th-century Russian male singers
20th-century Russian singers